Joshua Nadeau (born 12 September 1994) is a French professional footballer who plays as a defender for Luxembourg National Division club Rodange 91.

Career
Born in Paris, Nadeau made his professional debut for the AC Ajaccio first team on 18 August 2013 against reigning champions Paris Saint-Germain at Parc des Princes. He was given the first team opportunity as teammate Benjamin André was not eligible having received a red card in the previous match.

For the 2014–15 season Nadeau joined Cypriot First Division side AEL Limassol.

Having terminated his contract with AEL, he was six months without a club before trialling with Allsvenskan club Gefle IF. In February 2016, he signed a one-year contract including an option for two further years with Gefle.

In January 2017, Nadeau trialled with 3. Liga club F.C. Hansa Rostock and played in three friendlies before signing a 2.5-year contract until summer 2019. In late August 2018, his contract with Hansa Rostock was terminated on his request. He made 42 appearances for the club. 

On 27 August 2018, he signed a contract with Belgian side R.E. Virton.

Career statistics

References

1994 births
Living people
Footballers from Paris
Association football central defenders
French footballers
French expatriate footballers
AC Ajaccio players
AEL Limassol players
Gefle IF players
FC Hansa Rostock players
R.E. Virton players
AC Boulogne-Billancourt players
FC Rodange 91 players
Ligue 1 players
Championnat National 3 players
Cypriot First Division players
Allsvenskan players
3. Liga players
Belgian Third Division players
Luxembourg National Division players
French expatriate sportspeople in Cyprus
Expatriate footballers in Cyprus
French expatriate sportspeople in Sweden
Expatriate footballers in Sweden
French expatriate sportspeople in Germany
Expatriate footballers in Germany
French expatriate sportspeople in Belgium
Expatriate footballers in Belgium
French expatriate sportspeople in Luxembourg
Expatriate footballers in Luxembourg